Jugal Kalita is a professor and department chair of computer science at the  College of Engineering and Applied Science within the University  of Colorado, Colorado Springs. (UCCS)

Academics

Jugal Kalita is founder of the Language Information and Computation (LINC) Lab 
 at the University of Colorado Colorado Springs (UCCS).

Authorship
 On Perl: Perl for Students and Professionals, 2003, Universal Publishers
 Network Anomaly Detection: A Machine Learning Perspective, with Dhruba K. Bhattacharyya, 2013, CRC Press
 DDOS Attacks: Evolution, Detection, Prevention, Reaction and Tolerance, with Dhruba K. Bhattacharyya, 2016,  CRC Press
 Network Traffic Anomaly Detection and Prevention: Concepts, Techniques, and Tools, with Monowar H. Bhuyan and Dhruba K. Bhattacharyya, 2017, Springer Nature
 Gene Expression Data Analysis: A Statistical and Machine Learning Perspective", with Pankaj Barah and Dhruba Kumar Bhattacharyya, 2021, CRC PressMachine Learning: Theory and Practice'', CRC Press, 2023 CRC Press

References

External links

Living people
American non-fiction writers
University of Colorado Colorado Springs faculty
1960 births